The 2021 Charleston Open (branded as the 2021 Volvo Car Open for sponsorship reasons) was a women's professional tennis tournament played on outdoor clay courts at the Family Circle Tennis Center on Daniel Island in Charleston, South Carolina. It was the 48th edition of the event on the WTA Tour and was classified as a WTA 500 tournament on the 2021 WTA Tour. For 2021, it and the 2021 MUSC Health Women's Open held consecutively at the same facility were the only events of the annual tour's clay court season to be played on green clay. The 2021 edition of the event was the last to be sponsored by Chinese automaker Geely, the owner of Volvo Cars. 

Due to the COVID-19 pandemic and local health guidelines impacting the facility's construction timeline, tournament organizers held the event behind closed doors for the second consecutive year after the preceding year's exhibition tournament was held under similar conditions. The main stadium was demolished in 2020 and tournament organizers had originally planned to host the event for up to 3,000 fans on a smaller temporary stadium on the secondary court, named the Althea Gibson Court.

Veronika Kudermetova won her maiden career WTA title in the singles tournament. Nicole Melichar and Demi Schuurs won their third title as a team in the doubles tournament.

Champions

Singles 

  Veronika Kudermetova def.  Danka Kovinić, 6–4, 6–2

Doubles 

  Nicole Melichar /  Demi Schuurs def.  Marie Bouzková /  Lucie Hradecká, 6–2, 6–4

Points and prize money

Point distribution

Prize money

Singles main draw entrants

Seeds 

1 Rankings as of March 22, 2021.

Other entrants 
The following players received wildcards into the main draw:
  Hailey Baptiste 
  Belinda Bencic
  Petra Kvitová
  Emma Navarro
  Markéta Vondroušová

The following players received entry using a protected ranking into the main draw: 
  Andrea Petkovic
  Anastasia Potapova
  Yaroslava Shvedova

The following players received entry from the qualifying draw:
  Magdalena Fręch
  Desirae Krawczyk
  Grace Min
  Asia Muhammad
  Kurumi Nara
  Storm Sanders
  Gabriela Talabă
  Natalia Vikhlyantseva

The following players received entry as lucky losers:
  Harriet Dart
  Caroline Dolehide
  Whitney Osuigwe
  Wang Xinyu

Withdrawals 
Before the tournament
  Irina-Camelia Begu → replaced by  Leylah Annie Fernandez
  Kiki Bertens → replaced by  Wang Xinyu
  Anna Blinkova → replaced by  Tímea Babos
  Danielle Collins → replaced by  Martina Trevisan
  Fiona Ferro → replaced by  Anastasia Potapova
  Polona Hercog → replaced by  Nao Hibino
  Kaia Kanepi → replaced by  Caroline Dolehide
  Anett Kontaveit → replaced by  Harriet Dart
  Barbora Krejčíková → replaced by  Danka Kovinić
  Ann Li → replaced by  Misaki Doi
  Jeļena Ostapenko → replaced by  Christina McHale
  Anastasia Pavlyuchenkova → replaced by  Tsvetana Pironkova
  Jessica Pegula → replaced by  Zarina Diyas
  Rebecca Peterson → replaced by  Renata Zarazúa
  Maria Sakkari → replaced by  Francesca Di Lorenzo
  Laura Siegemund → replaced by  Liudmila Samsonova
  Kateřina Siniaková → replaced by  Lauren Davis
  Jil Teichmann → replaced by  Madison Brengle
  Markéta Vondroušová → replaced by  Whitney Osuigwe
  Heather Watson → replaced by  Caty McNally

Retirements 
  Garbiñe Muguruza
  Elena Rybakina

Doubles main draw entrants

Seeds 

1 Rankings as of March 22, 2021.

Other entrants 
The following pair received a wildcard into the doubles main draw:
  Caroline Dolehide /  Emma Navarro

The following pairs received entry into the doubles main draw using protected rankings:
  Oksana Kalashnikova /  Alla Kudryavtseva
  Vania King /  Yaroslava Shvedova
  Ellen Perez /  CoCo Vandeweghe

Withdrawals 
Before the tournament
  Ashleigh Barty /  Storm Sanders → replaced by  Misaki Doi /  Nao Hibino
  Anna Blinkova /  Lucie Hradecká → replaced by  Oksana Kalashnikova /  Alla Kudryavtseva
During the tournament
  Tímea Babos /  Veronika Kudermetova
  Coco Gauff /  Caty McNally

References

External links 
 Tournament details at the ITF
 

2021 WTA Tour
2021 in American tennis
2021 in sports in South Carolina
2021 Volvo Car Open
April 2021 sports events in the United States